Kostadin Stefanov Kostadinov (born 25 June 1959) is a former Bulgarian footballer who played as a winger.

Career
During his career, he played for Trakia Plovdiv in Bulgaria and made 350 appearances in the Bulgarian championship, scoring 106 goals. Kostadinov also played for the Bulgaria national football team (48 caps/10 goals) from 1979 to 1986.

He later coached PFC Hebar Pazardzhik.

Honours
Botev Plovdiv
Bulgarian Cup: 1980–81

References

External links

1959 births
Living people
Bulgarian footballers
Bulgaria international footballers
Botev Plovdiv players
S.C. Braga players
First Professional Football League (Bulgaria) players
Primeira Liga players
Bulgarian expatriate footballers
Expatriate footballers in Portugal
1986 FIFA World Cup players
Bulgarian football managers
Botev Plovdiv managers
PFC Hebar Pazardzhik managers
Association football forwards